This list contains about half of the cultural property of national significance (class A) in the canton of Bern from the 2009 Swiss Inventory of Cultural Property of National and Regional Significance. It is sorted by municipality and contains 345 individual buildings, 43 collections, 30 archaeological finds and 4 other, special sites or objects.

The geographic coordinates provided are in the Swiss coordinate system as given in the Inventory.

: Top - A B C D E F G H I J K L M N through Z

Aarberg

Aarwangen

Aegerten

Allmendingen

Amsoldingen

Arni

Attiswil

Bätterkinden

Belp

Bern

Biel/Bienne

Bleienbach

Blumenstein

Bönigen

Bolligen

Boltigen

Bowil

Bremgarten

Brienz

Brienzwiler

Brüttelen

Büren an der Aare

Burgdorf

Burgistein

Champoz

Corgémont

Cortébert

Crémines

Därstetten

Deisswil

Diemtigen

Dotzigen

Dürrenroth

Eggiwil

Epsach

Erlach

Erlenbach

Ersigen

Ferenbalm

Fraubrunnen

Frauenkappelen

Frutigen

Gals

Gampelen

Gerzensee

Grandval

Grindelwald

Grosshöchstetten

Gsteig bei Gstaad

Gsteigwiler

Guggisberg

Guttannen

Hagneck

Hasle

Häutligen

Heimiswil

Herzogenbuchsee

Hilterfingen

Hindelbank

Hofstetten

Huttwil

Innertkirchen

Ins

Interlaken

Iseltwald

Ittigen

Jegenstorf

Kallnach

Kandergrund

Kandersteg

Kehrsatz

Kiesen

Kirchberg

Kirchdorf

Kirchlindach

Köniz

Koppigen

La Ferrière

La Neuveville

Langenthal

Langnau

Lauenen

Laupen

Lauperswil

Lauterbrunnen

Leuzigen

Ligerz

Lotzwil

Lüscherz

Lützelflüh

Lyssach

Mattstetten

Meienried

Meiringen

Melchnau

Moosseedorf

Mötschwil

Moutier

Mühleberg

Münchenbuchsee

Münchenwiler

Münsingen

Muri bei Bern

References
 All entries, addresses and coordinates are from:

External links
 Swiss Inventory of Cultural Property of National and Regional Significance, 2009 edition:
PDF documents: Class A objects
PDF documents: Class B objects
Geographic information system

.01
Canton of Bern
Cultural02
Cultural02
Cultural02
Cultural02